Green is the twelfth studio album by the Japanese rock duo B'z, released on July 3, 2002. The album sold 800,120 copies in its first week, about 40,000 copies more than previous studio album Eleven and sold 1,131,788 copies overall.

The album was the beginning of the band's transition to Being Inc.'s Vermillion Records label.

Track listing
"Stay Green ~Mijyuku na Tabi wa Tomaranai~ – 3:08
"熱き鼓動の果て" [Atsuki Kodō no Hate] – 4:05
"Warp" – 3:48
"Signal" – 4:17
"Surfin' 3000GTR" – 3:47
"Blue Sunshine" – 3:49
"Ultra Soul" – 3:38
"美しき世界" [Utsukushiki Sekai] – 4:42
"Everlasting" – 3:38
"Forever Mine" – 3:38
"The Spiral" – 3:26
"Go★Fight★Win" – 3:15

Personnel
Tak Matsumoto (guitar)
Koshi Inaba (vocals)

Certifications

External links
B'z official Web site (in Japanese)

B'z albums
Being Inc. albums
2002 albums
Japanese-language albums